The fourth season of Married at First Sight premiered on 30 January 2017 on the Nine Network. Relationship experts John Aiken, Mel Schilling and Trisha Stratford all returned from the previous season to match 10 brides and 10 grooms together. In episode 9 of the experiment, the experts re-matched Cheryl and Andrew after their previous marriages came to abrupt ends.

Couple profiles

Commitment ceremony history

  This couple left the experiment outside of commitment ceremony.
  This couple elected to leave the experiment during the commitment ceremony.

Controversy
Groom Andrew Jones shocked viewers when during a "boy's night" he made sexist and mocking comments about wife Cheryl Maitland's appearance and intelligence. During the Reunion, Andrew failed to apologise for his actions, insisting that his behaviour was acceptable. Fellow Groom Anthony Manton was accused of bullying wife Nadia Stamp, with viewers labelling him as "arrogant" and "controlling" after he complained about a lack of intimacy in their relationship.

Ratings

References

4
2017 Australian television seasons
Television shows filmed in Australia